Premià de Dalt is a municipality in the comarca of the Maresme in Catalonia, Spain. It has a population of 9,788.

References

External links
 Government data pages 

Municipalities in Maresme